The spotted ground gecko or Japanese cave gecko (Goniurosaurus orientalis) is a gecko endemic to the Ryukyu Islands, Japan. Goniurosaurus orientalis is found in four small islands in the Okinawa group: Tonaki Island, Tokashiki Island, Ie Island, and Aka Island.

This particular species grows up to 16 cm and it has deep red eyes. Its basic color is dark brown or black with an orange or red pattern.

As with other geckos from the family Eublepharidae, they have fully functional eyelids.

Habitat and ecology
Goniurosaurus orientalis inhabits mountainous regions or limestone areas covered with broad-leaved evergreen forests. It is generally an uncommon species.

References

Goniurosaurus
Endemic reptiles of Japan
Endemic fauna of the Ryukyu Islands
Reptiles described in 1931